The Pristerognathus Assemblage Zone is a tetrapod assemblage zone or biozone which correlates to the upper Abrahamskraal Formation and lowermost Teekloof Formation, Adelaide Subgroup of the Beaufort Group, a fossiliferous and geologically important geological Group of the Karoo Supergroup in South Africa. Exposures are also found west of Colesberg and south of Graaff-Reinet. The Pristerognathus Assemblage Zone is the third biozone of the Beaufort Group.

The name of the biozone refers to Pristerognathus polyodon, a medium-sized carnivorous therocephalian therapsid. It is characterized by the presence of this therocephalian species in association with Diictodon feliceps, a small, fossorial dicynodont whose fossils are especially common in this biozone.

History 
The first fossils to be found in the Beaufort Group rocks that encompass the current eight biozones were discovered by Andrew Geddes Bain in 1856. However, it was not until 1892 that it was observed that the geological strata of the Beaufort Group could be differentiated based on their fossil taxa. The initial undertaking was done by Harry Govier Seeley who subdivided the Beaufort Group into three biozones, which he named (from oldest to youngest):
 Zone of "Pareiasaurians"
 Zone of "Dicynodonts"
 Zone of "highly specialized group of theriodonts"

These proposed biozones Seeley named were subdivided further by Robert Broom between 1906 and 1909. Broom proposed the following biozones (from oldest to youngest):
 Pareiasaurus beds
 Endothiodon beds
 Kistecephalus beds
 Lystrosaurus beds
 Procolophon beds
 Cynognathus beds

The Pristerognathus Assemblage Zone as it currently stands was defined by Keyser and Smith in the late 1970s. Initially the biozone included the upper 300m of the underlying Tapinocephalus Assemblage Zone due to the disappearance of Dinocephalian fossils in those rock deposits and had been named the Pristerognathus-Diictodon Assemblage Zone. After further research on the rocks of the middle Permian, it was understood that the disappearance of the dinocephalians was not an indication of the boundary of the Tapinocephalus Assemblage Zone, and the extra 300m of rock was subsequently restored to the underlying Tapinocephalus Assemblage Zone.

Lithology 
The  Pristerognathus Assemblage Zone correlates with the upper Abrahamskraal Formation, the lowermost Teekloof Formation west of 24°E and to the Middleton Formation east of 24°E, Adelaide Subgroup of the Beaufort Group. This biozone is considered to be Middle Permian (Guadalupian) in age.

The rocks of the Pristerognathus Assemblage Zone are similar to the underlying Tapinocephalus Assemblage Zone although is dominated by multistory sandstone deposits. The sandstones are interspaced with silt-rich greenish-grey mudstones and subordinate reddish-brown mudstone layers. Calcareous nodules, which weather out brown, are often found in the mudstone layers. Pinkish chert bands are found in the lowermost mudstone deposits of this biozone. The Pristerognathus Assemblage Zone is also known for containing uranium deposits. The presence of the chert band confirms that there was volcanic activity taking place during the time the rock sediments were deposited. The rocks of the lower Pristerognathus Assemblage Zone were deposited at the end of the middle Permian (end-Guadalupian) extinction event, which is currently thought to have been caused by the eruption of the Emeishan Large Igneous Province.

The depositional environment of the Pristerognathus Assemblage Zone was likewise similar to the Tapinocephalus Assemblage Zone, having been formed by sedimentary material being deposited by vast, fluvial plains. These fluvial plains flowed northwards from a foreland basin that was being formed from the rising of the Gondwanide mountains in the south. The Gondwanides were the result of crustal uplift that had previously begun to take course due to tectonic activity. The pressure of the growing Gondwanides mountain chain caused the formation of the Karoo Basin where the deposits of the Pristerognathus Assemblage zone, and all other succeeding assemblage zone deposits, were deposited over tens of millions of years.

Paleontology 
Vertebrate fossils are most commonly found in the mudstone deposits of the Pristerognathus Assemblage Zone, especially within the calcareous nodules. This biozone is characterized by the presence of Pristerognathus polyodon and its other subspecies Pristerognathus baini and Pristerognathus vanderbyli.  Pristerognathus fossils are usually found associated with those of Diictodon. The fossils of both these taxa are the most commonly found; other fossil taxa are markedly more rare. Species diversity dropped off after the end-Guadalupian extinction, which is the reason that this biozone is lacking in species richness. Other taxa that have been found in this biozone include a couple pareiasaur species, namely Bradysaurus, the putative pantestudine Eunotosaurus africanus, and the varanopid pelycosaur Heleosaurus scholtzi. Fossils of the biarmosuchian Hipposaurus boonstrai  are likewise found including some gorgonopsid species. Other dicynodont species found include Endothiodon uniseries and Pristerodon mackayi. Finally, fossils of temnospondyl amphibians such as of Rhinesuchus whaitsi, the fishes Namaichthys and Atherstonia, invertebrate trackways, burrows, and feeding trails such as of Planolites and a variety of plant fossils, namely of Glossopteris, Phyllotheca, and Schizoneura, have been recovered. Some fossil taxa that have been found from this biozone, namely Hipposaurus, have been recovered from geological formations from different countries which correlate in age. Hipposaurus fossils have been found in the Madumabisa Mudstone Formation in Zambia.

See also 

 List of synapsids

References 

South African assemblage zones
Permian South Africa
Guadalupian